XHMOE-FM is a radio station in Mexicali, Baja California, Mexico. Broadcasting on 90.7 FM, XHMOE is owned by Radiópolis and carries the Los 40 format.

History
The station's concession was awarded in 1993.

References

Spanish-language radio stations
Radio stations established in 1993
1993 establishments in Mexico
Radio stations in Mexicali
Radiópolis